The Lego Movie (Original Motion Picture Soundtrack) is the soundtrack to the 2014 computer-animated film The Lego Movie. It was released by WaterTower Music on February 4, 2014. The album features original score composed by Mark Mothersbaugh, containing of about 23 tracks in the album. He recorded two scores for the film: an electronic and a 40-piece orchestral music, with more than 100 players working on the score. He arranged few synthesisers and circuit bent to make use of the electronic music created for the film, which consisted of "bright, popping, almost frenetic music with an underpinning of emotional swells".

The album features an original song titled "Everything Is Awesome" written by Shawn Patterson, Joshua Bartholomew, and Lisa Harriton, who also performed the song in the film under the name, Jo Li. The track which was released as a single from the album on January 23, is performed by Tegan and Sara featuring The Lonely Island (Andy Samberg, Akiva Schaffer, and Jorma Taccone) who wrote the rap lyrics, and is the first song played in the opening credits of the film, while the alternative version sung by Jo Li was featured in the end credits. It also featured an unplugged version by Patterson and Sammy Allen and an instrumental version.

The score and the song received positive reception, praising Mothersbaugh's composition. The track "Everything Is Awesome" received a nomination for Academy Award for Best Original Song and Grammy Award for Best Song Written for Visual Media.

Overview 
The film marks Mothersbaugh's second collaboration with Phil Lord and Christopher Miller after Cloudy with a Chance of Meatballs (2009) and 21 Jump Street (2012). He worked on the score of the film, simultaneously with the music production of their forthcoming film 22 Jump Street, also directed by Lord and Miller and is a sequel to 22 Jump Street. The score was recorded at Trackdown Studios, Sydney during late-2013 and 2014.

In an interview with Entertainment Weekly, Mothersbaugh stated "We were looking for sounds that created a universe for the LEGOs that was unique [...] I started assembling a sonic palette off of old analog synths that I used with DEVO and newer circuit bent things that I got in the past three or four years and then just kind of borrowing from electronic music through the years. You think of LEGOs as these rigid horizontal and vertical pieces. But to see them as clouds and explosions, or water running [...] it made me want to come up with sounds that were as interesting as the way they were making the film look." Hence, Mothersbaugh created an electronic and orchestral score, the later consisted of a 40-piece choir and about 100-players to emphasize the story and allow the directors Lord and Miller which sound will suit for the film.

The duo wrote the original song "Everything is Awesome" before the shooting of the film. In an interview with Fox News, Mothersbaugh says the song "was supposed to be like mind control early in the film. It's totally irritating, this kind of mindless mantra to get people up and working. It's like the whip crack on their back, but then by the end of the movie it morphs into, instead of being just a mindless, go-to-work song it becomes about co-operation and people working together to do bigger things." He recorded several versions of the track which appears throughout the film in varying contexts. However, according to him, the version sung by The Lonely Island, was "one of his favourite".

With the exception for The Lego Batman Movie (2017), which was composed by Lorne Balfe, Mothersbaugh returned to score music for The Lego Ninjago Movie (2017) and the direct sequel, The Lego Movie 2: The Second Part (2019). The remix version of "Everything Is Awesome" performed by Tween Dream was featured in the sequel, and a spin-off track titled "Everything's Not Awesome" was created.

Track listing

Charts

Accolades

Notes

References

External links 
 

2010s film soundtrack albums
2014 soundtrack albums
Film scores
Animated film soundtracks
WaterTower Music soundtracks
The Lego Movie (franchise)
Adventure film soundtracks
Comedy film soundtracks